Narsarsuaq Airport  is an airport located in Narsarsuaq, a settlement in the Kujalleq municipality in southern Greenland. Along with Kangerlussuaq Airport, it is one of two airports in Greenland capable of serving large airliners. It is also the only international airport in southern Greenland. The settlement it serves is small, with the airport primarily functioning as a transfer point for passengers heading for the helicopter hubs of Air Greenland in Qaqortoq and Nanortalik. The airport is to be closed in 2025 when Qaqortoq Airport is scheduled to open.

History

World War II
The airfield at Narsarsuaq was first built by the United States Department of War (now the Department of Defense) as an army airbase, its construction beginning in July 1941 and the first aircraft landing in January 1942. During World War II the airbase−codenamed Bluie West One−hosted squadrons of PBY Catalina flying boats and B-25 Mitchell bombers with the assignment to escort allied convoys and track and destroy German submarines.

A military hospital with 250 beds was completed in 1943. Approximately 4,000 people were stationed at the base during the war. It is estimated that during that time more than 10,000 aircraft were ferried through the airbase. On 6 July 1942 the supply ship SS Montrose was wrecked on a cliff in the Tunulliarfik Fjord southwest of the airbase. The first aircraft from the Danish Air Force stationed at Narsarsuaq was a PBY Catalina in 1947 and a B-17 Flying Fortress in 1948.

After the war

Civil air traffic began in 1949 with Douglas DC-4 propliners operated by Scandinavian Airlines System (SAS) and Icelandair. US and Denmark signed The Agreement related to the defense of Greenland on 27 April 1951, with both countries agreeing to share the Bluie West One airbase. In 1952, the Danish Air Force stationed Airgroup West with a PBY Catalina at the airport.

The US Air Force left Bluie West One in November 1958, and the airbase was closed. In January 1959, M/S Hans Hedtoft of Denmark and all on board were lost near the southern tip of Greenland. The Danish Authorities decided to reopen the airport soon after. From November 1959, the Danish Air Force had three PBY Catalinas stationed at Narsarsuaq with the assignment to make ice-observations along the coast of Greenland, and these observations were broadcast to ships in the area.

In the 1960s and 1970s, Greenlandair and SAS both served Narsarsuaq with Douglas DC-6 propliners while Icelandair operated Boeing 727 jets.  During the 1980s, SAS operated Douglas DC-8 jets at Narsarsuaq. Since 1 January 1988, the airport has been operated by Mittarfeqarfiit, the Greenland Airport Administration. Ice-observations are still based at Narsarsuaq and carried out with the AS350 Eurocopter aircraft.

Decline
The airport served as a regional focus city for Air Greenland until the late 2000s, when tough economic conditions forced the airline to raise the low season prices several times. In 2009 the airline announced the sale of Kunuunnguaq, a Boeing 757-200, one of two airliners in the fleet, serving the Narsarsuaq-Copenhagen route. Later the same year, the airline announced the acquisition of two new STOL aircraft, being de Havilland Canada Dash-8 200 turboprops, one of which would serve the newly opened triangular route between Narsarsuaq, Nuuk, and Reykjavík-Keflavík.

The new route was closed before the first flights could commence, adding to resentment amongst businesses and the community of South Greenland. The declared demand for the direct connection with Iceland was not reflected in ticket sales numbers, which contributed to the pullout decision.

With the Boeing airliner sold on 26 April 2010, the entire Kujalleq municipality, and southern Greenland in general remains without prospects for a direct connection to continental Europe. The financial crisis of 2008–2010, the air travel disruption after the 2010 Eyjafjallajökull eruption both contributed to lower passenger demand, while competition from Air Iceland on the route to Iceland rendered the prospected Air Greenland route to faraway Denmark unprofitable, leading directly to the decline in traffic in southern Greenland. Re-establishment of a direct route to continental Europe was unlikely to happen in 2011. In 2012 flights to/from Copenhagen started in the summer by chartering a separate operator.

Future 

The new airport in Qaqortoq is currently under construction and is scheduled to open in 2025. This eliminates the need for Narsarsuaq as a domestic and Iceland-bound gateway to South Greenland. In 2022 the Greenlandic government decided that Narsarsuaq will be downscaled to a heliport, losing the runway. General aviation, historic planes and ferry flights crossing the North Atlantic ocean must use alternative airports for refuelling. Narsarsuaq village will remain inhabited, though the loss of the airport function is already having its toll.

The first Greenland Air Trophy took place at Narsarsuaq Airport, 30 June 2019.  The winning pilot was Rene Petersen of Greenland, second and third places both taken by French pilots.

Facilities
In the terminal there is a simple cafeteria, a duty-free 'Nanoq' shop, as well as a small tourist office, which helps coordinate general aviation activities at the airport.

Airlines and destinations

Accidents and incidents
On 13 May 1957, a DC-4 freight aircraft operated by US Overseas Airlines hit the icecap on approach to Narsarsuaq. Two were killed, of three on board.

On 5 August 2001, Dassault Falcon 20C freight aircraft of Naske Air crashed on approach to Narsarsuaq. It planned a fuel stop, going from Poland to the US. Three people were killed, including a passenger.

Ground transport
Transfers to local settlements are normally done by boat or helicopter flights. Diskoline sells tickets to boats to Narsaq and Qaqortoq. Boats require a bus transfer since the port is around 2.5 km (1.5 mi) from the terminal.

References

External links

Airports in Greenland